Terrell Lamark Stafford (born November 25, 1966, Miami) is an American jazz trumpeter.

Stafford studied music formally, taking a bachelor's degree in Music Education at the University of Maryland in 1988 and a master's degree at Rutgers in 1991. He played in the orchestras for Broadway musicals in the 1980s, and in jazz has worked with Bobby Watson, Kenny Barron, Tim Warfield, Bruce Barth, Cedar Walton, Don Braden, Shirley Scott, McCoy Tyner, Stephen Scott, and others. He has worked with the Lincoln Center Jazz Orchestra and the Carnegie Hall Jazz Band, and has taught at Cheyney University and Temple University.

Discography
Centripetal Force (Candid Records, 1997)
New Beginnings (Maxjazz, 2003)
Fields of Gold (feat. Antonio Hart, Bill Cunliffe) (Nagel Heyer Records, 2004)
Taking Chances: Live at the Dakota (Maxjazz, 2007)
Bridging the Gap with Dick Oatts (Planet Arts, 2011)
Cocktail Hour with Chamberlain Brass (Self-released, 2013)
BrotherLee Love (Capri Records, 2015)
This Side of Strayhorn (MaxxJazz, 2016)
Forgive And Forget (CD Baby, 2016)

References

American jazz trumpeters
American male trumpeters
Musicians from Miami
American male jazz musicians
Nagel-Heyer Records artists
Candid Records artists

de:Terrell Stafford